This is a complete list of episodes of  Maison Ikkoku, an anime television, OVA, and film series based on the manga by Rumiko Takahashi.  There were 96 regular episodes, three OVAs, an animated film, and a live action film.

The anime uses five opening theme songs and six closing themes. The first opening theme is "Kanashimi yo Konnichi wa" by Yuki Saito, used for the first 37 episodes with the exception of episode 24, which uses "Alone Again (Naturally)" by Gilbert O'Sullivan, although the previous opening takes its place in the English dub due to copyright issues. The opening theme that replaced the first opening in episode 38 is "Suki sa" by Anzen Chitai which was used until episode 52. The last two opening themes are "Sunny Shiny Morning" by Kiyonori Matsuo, used from episodes 53–76 and "Hidamari" by Kōzō Murashita for the remainder of the series. The first ending theme for the first 14 episodes is "Ashita Hareru ka" by Takao Kisugi, which was replaced by "Ci·ne·ma" by Picasso in episode 15 which continued to be in use until episode 33. In episode 24, that theme was replaced by "Get Down" also by O'Sullivan but same reason as before with the second opening theme. The second ending theme was replaced by "Fantasy" by Picasso in episode 34 which continued to be in use until episode 52. The final two ending themes are "Sayonara no Sobyō" ("Sayonara no dessan") by Picasso which was used for episodes 53–76 and "Begin the Night" by Picasso for the remainder of the series.

Television series

Season 1 (1986)

Season 2 (1986–87)

Season 3 (1987)

Season 4 (1987–88)

Original video animations

Film

Live action 
Toei Company released a live action movie after the first season on 10 October 1986. There were also 2 live-action TV specials aired in 2007 and 2008.

Notes

References 

Episodes
Maison Ikkoku